Charles "Buff" Kirkland (born October 18, 1950) is an American retired basketball player. He was a 6 ft 5 in (1.98 m) tall forward . He was drafted with the 129th pick in the 1982 NBA draft by the Milwaukee Bucks. From 1974 to 1982, Kirkland played in the Dutch Eredivisie, with Punch, EBBC Den Bosch, Flamingo's Haarlem and Donar. He was named to the league's All-Defense Team six times.

References 

Living people
American men's basketball players
Heroes Den Bosch players
Donar (basketball club) players
1950 births
DSBV Punch players
Flamingo's Haarlem players